The 2016 Dalian Women's Tennis Open was a professional tennis tournament played on hard courts. It was the first edition of the tournament which was part of the 2016 WTA 125K series and took place in Dalian, China, from 6 to 11 September 2016.

Singles draw entrants

Seeds 

 1 Rankings are as of 29 August 2016.

Other entrants 
The following players received wildcards into the singles main draw:
  Lu Jiajing
  Peng Shuai
  Tang Haochen
  Yang Zhaoxuan

The following players received entry from the qualifying draw:
  Chang Kai-chen
  Lu Jingjing
  Peangtarn Plipuech
  You Xiaodi

The following player received entry by a lucky loser spot:
  Han Na-lae

Doubles draw entrants

Seeds 

 1 Rankings are as of 16 August 2016.

Other entrants 
The following players received wildcards into the singles main draw:
  Aleksandra Krunić /  Li Yuenu

Champions

Singles 

  Kristýna Plíšková def.  Misa Eguchi, 7–5, 4–6, 2–5 ret.

Doubles 

  Lee Ya-hsuan /  Kotomi Takahata def.  Nicha Lertpitaksinchai /  Jessy Rompies, 6–2, 6–1

External links
 Official website 
 Tournament page at wtatennis.com

2016 WTA 125K series
2016
2016 in Chinese tennis